Macna darabitalis is a species of snout moth in the genus Macna. It was described by Pieter Cornelius Tobias Snellen in 1895. It is found on Java.

References

Moths described in 1895
Pyralini